Highway 50 also known as Karak Highway is an East-West Highway in Jordan. It starts from Highway 15 and ends at Highway 65. The highway is the main access route to the city of Karak. The highway is a 4-lane divided route east of Karak.

See also
Itinerary of the highway on google maps

Roads in Jordan